The 1997 South Africa rugby union tour of Europe was a series of matches played in November and December 1997 in Europe by South Africa national rugby union team.

Results 
Scores and results list South Africa's points tally first.

References 

1997 rugby union tours
1997 in South African rugby union
1997
1997–98 in English rugby union
1997–98 in Scottish rugby union
1997–98 in French rugby union
1997–98 in Italian rugby union
1997–98 in European rugby union
1997
1997
1997
1997